The Outfit is a 2022 American psychological crime drama thriller film directed by Graham Moore in his directorial debut from a screenplay by Moore and Johnathan McClain. The film stars Mark Rylance who leads an ensemble cast including Zoey Deutch, Johnny Flynn, Dylan O'Brien, Nikki Amuka-Bird, and Simon Russell Beale. Rylance plays an English  cutter who works at a tailor shop in Chicago, whose primary customers are a family of vicious gangsters. The film premiered at the 72nd Berlin International Film Festival on February 14, 2022, and released in the United States on March 18, 2022, by Focus Features, to positive reviews.

Plot

In 1956 Chicago, Leonard Burling is an English cutter who runs a custom tailor shop in a neighborhood controlled by Irish Mob boss Roy Boyle. Roy's son and second-in-command, Richie, and his chief enforcer, Francis, use Leonard's shop as a stash house for dirty money; Leonard tolerates this arrangement as the Boyles and their men are his best customers. Leonard also shares a complicated relationship with shop receptionist Mable, who is also Richie's girlfriend.

One night, Francis shows up at the shop with Richie, who's been shot in the belly after a confrontation with the rival LaFontaine family. Leonard is forced at gunpoint to treat Richie's wounds and hide a briefcase containing a copy of an FBI recording with detailed information on the crew's operations, which was provided by "The Outfit", a nationwide syndicate founded by Al Capone. Francis gets in touch with Roy and departs, leaving Leonard and Richie alone. Richie believes that there is a rat in their organization, as the LaFontaines seem to know their every move, and believes that the recording will reveal the rat's identity. Leonard suggests to Richie that Francis is the rat.

When Francis returns, Leonard intercepts him, claiming that Richie is light-headed and delusional from blood loss. Richie threatens Francis, who kills him. He and Leonard hide Richie's body just as Roy arrives with his bodyguard Monk. The two men lie and tell Roy that Richie left the store on his own; Francis volunteers to go find him. Roy notices Richie's coat in the store's backroom and threatens Leonard. Francis then returns with Mable in tow, claiming that he found Richie's blood in her apartment and suggesting that she is the rat. When Roy orders his men to torture her for information, Leonard distracts him by revealing the reason why he came to Chicago: his wife and daughter were killed in a fire at his former shop and home on Savile Row.

The shop's phone rings and Leonard answers it; he lies that the call was from Richie, who is waiting for Roy. Roy and Monk depart but Francis insists on staying. Leonard convinces Francis to betray Roy by using Mable, who really is the rat and has been selling information to LaFontaine and the FBI; Roy's death at LaFontaine's hands will allow Francis to take over Roy's business. At Leonard's urging, Mable calls Violet LaFontaine to give her Roy's location and offer to sell her the recording. Francis hides at the back of the store when Violet arrives, intending to kill her, but Leonard warns Violet and her bodyguards shoot Francis twice instead. Mable takes the payment, and Violet leaves with the tape.

It is revealed that the night's events played out due to Leonard's manipulation. Leonard has been deceiving the Boyles by planting fake messages from The Outfit, and knew that Mable has allowed the FBI to place a bug in his store. The recording Violet took was a fake; the real one is still in the store and has been recording the night's conversations, capturing enough information to convict any remaining Boyles as well as LaFontaine. Leonard gives Mable the real tape to send to the FBI and urges her to use LaFontaine's money to live her dreams. 

Intending to start over again, Leonard douses the store with flammable liquid and lights it with a match, but is interrupted when Francis gets up and tries to kill him. Leonard tells Francis that he used to be a gang enforcer like Francis, but left when he was ordered to commit a heinous crime. Fleeing from his gang, he reinvented himself and started a family, until his old gang found them and burned down his shop, killing his wife and daughter. Leonard fatally stabs Francis in the neck with his prized fabric shears. Wearing a dark jacket to hide his wounds, he quietly leaves the store as it burns.

Cast

 Mark Rylance as Leonard Burling
 Johnny Flynn as Francis
 Zoey Deutch as Mable Shaun
 Dylan O'Brien as Richie Boyle
 Simon Russell Beale as Roy Boyle 
 Nikki Amuka-Bird as Violet LaFontaine
 Alan Mehdizadeh as Monk

Production

The Outfit is the directorial debut of Graham Moore. It was written by Moore and Johnathan McClain, and produced by FilmNation Entertainment. In January 2021, the film was announced. In February, Focus Features pre-bought the distribution rights, and Mark Rylance, Zoey Deutch, Dylan O'Brien, and Johnny Flynn joined the cast. In April, Simon Russell Beale and Nikki Amuka-Bird were added to the cast. Principal photography began on March 5, 2021, at Troubadour Wembley Park Theatre near London, England, with cinematographer Dick Pope. Filming wrapped in early April. During post-production, editing was completed by William Goldenberg and the musical score was composed by Alexandre Desplat.

Release
The film premiered at the 2022 Berlin International Film Festival on February 14, 2022. It was theatrically released in the United States on March 18, 2022, after being postponed from its original February 25 date. The film was released on streaming on April 8, 2022 by Peacock, and on Blu-ray and DVD on May 3, 2022, by Universal Pictures Home Entertainment.

Reception

Box office
In the United States and Canada, The Outfit was released alongside Jujutsu Kaisen 0, Umma, and X, and was projected to gross $750,000–2.5 million from 1,324 theaters in its opening weekend. The film earned $1.5 million in its opening weekend, finishing eighth. Men made up 56% of the audience during its opening, with those above the age of 35 comprising 60% of ticket sales and those above 45 comprising 40%. The ethnic breakdown of the audience showed that 60% were Caucasian, 15% Hispanic and Latino Americans, 10% African American, and 15% Asian or other. The film dropped out of the box office top ten in its second weekend, finishing twelfth with $568,180.

Critical response

  Audiences polled by PostTrak gave the film a 74% positive score, with 55% saying they would definitely recommend it.

The performances of the cast, especially Rylance's, were well received. Critics gave positive notes to the costume and production design, cinematography, score, and Moore's screenplay. Deadline Hollywoods Pete Hammond said Moore had "crafted a literate and thrilling gangster picture that brings a fresh touch to a well-worn genre".

References

External links
 
 

2022 films
2022 crime drama films
2022 directorial debut films
American crime drama films
FilmNation Entertainment films
Films shot in London
Films about the Chicago Outfit
Films about the Irish Mob
Focus Features films
Films scored by Alexandre Desplat
Films set in Chicago
2020s English-language films
2020s American films